Stráne pod Tatrami is a village and municipality in Kežmarok District in the Prešov Region of north Slovakia.

History
In historical records the village was first mentioned in 1438. It belonged to a German language island. The German population was expelled in 1945.

Geography
The municipality lies at an altitude of 700 metres and covers an area of 4.218 km² . It has a population of about 2000 inhabitants.

Demographics
According to 2010 census total population had been 2083. In the village is sizeable Roma nationality, which had been claimed by 1078 inhabitants, which is ca. 52% of the total population. In 2010 there had been 1039 males and 1044 females, what is ca. 50% for both.

References

External links
http://stranepodtatrami.e-obce.sk

Villages and municipalities in Kežmarok District
Romani communities in Slovakia